Thompson Speedway Motorsports Park (TSMP), formerly Thompson Speedway and Thompson International Speedway, is a motorsports park in Thompson, Connecticut, featuring a  high-banked paved oval racetrack and a  road racing course. Once known as the "Indianapolis of the East", it was the first asphalt-paved racing oval track in the United States and is now under the NASCAR Whelen All-American Series banner. Each year Thompson hosts one of the great fall variety events "The World Series of Auto Racing" highlighted by the International Supermodified Association and the NASCAR Whelen Modified Tour. This event frequently draws over 350 race cars in 16 separate divisions over three days. Besides that, it currently hosts NASCAR Whelen Modified Tour, and also hosted various SCCA sports car races between 1957 and 1972, NASCAR Grand National series races between 1951 and 1970, and two SCCA F5000 events in 1968 and 1969.

History

Following cleanup from the hurricane of 1938, John Hoenig built a combined  paved oval and  road racing course on his farmland in the northeast corner of Connecticut.

In the 1960s and 1970s, Thompson's Sunday night program was a who's who of modified greats such as Carl "Bugs" Stevens, Fred DeSarro, Fred Schulz, Ron Bouchard, Ed Flemke, Leo Cleary, Smoky Boutwell, and Geoff Bodine. During this period the track hosted memorable special events which drew legendary Southern drivers like Ray Hendrick in the famous "Fireball" #11 to battle the locals.  Other surprise stars included Long Island's Fred Harbach and Rene Charland from Massachusetts.

In the late 1970s, the track drew 55 winged Super Modifieds to their World Series race.  By owner's choice, all 55 started. During the energy crisis of the 1970s, Thompson hosted a unique division called the "Open Competitive" division which merged the Super Modifieds with the Modifieds.  Later, Thompson tried a lower-cost stock-cylinder-head modified division, which chased away some of the tracks regulars.  Until the 1980s the track had a unique barrier outside turns 1–2 and 3–4 made of dirt fill.

Today
Hoenig's grandson D.R. and great-grandson Jonathan continue to operate the family-owned facility.  As of June 1, 2013, the Hoenig family began work to reconstruct the  road course with and accompanying paddock and staging areas, and the website reflected the renaming of the facility to Thompson Speedway Motorsports Park. The newly rebuilt road course celebrated its "soft opening" with the New England Region of SCCA on the weekend of June 6–8, 2014.  Thompson created a private club for individual use of the road course, the website <http://www.thompsonspeedway.com/index.php> notes that "The Club" will be limited to 200 members.

Thompson Speedway Motorsports Park continues to run NASCAR-sanctioned races on the oval track, with 10 oval events scheduled for 2019. The two largest events, The Icebreaker and The Sunoco World Series of Speedway Racing are traditionally New England’s season opener and season finale. Both multi-day events draw several hundred race cars from up to 18 divisions. The Road course hosts many more events such as SCCA major and regional races, vintage race festivals, high performance driving events (HPDEs) and drifting.
The park has hosted four events for the 24 Hours of LeMons series. The first was in August 2015 [2], and the most recent was in August 2018. [3]
In June 2017, the park hosted two rounds of the 2017 Global RallyCross Championship using a combination of the road course and a dirt track. [4]

The park has hosted four events for the 24 Hours of LeMons series. The first was in August 2015 [2], and the most recent was in August 2018. [3]
In June 2017, the park hosted two rounds of the 2017 Global RallyCross Championship using a combination of the road course and a dirt track. [4]

In June 2017, the park hosted two rounds of the 2017 Global RallyCross Championship using a combination of the road course and a dirt track

Use in simulations / games 
The current layout appears in the online racing simulation iRacing where it is laser scanned for millimeter accuracy.

A recreation of the track as it appeared in 1970 is included in the retro-themed game NASCAR Legends.

Notable race results

Atlantic Championship Series

Deaths
Thompson Speedway Motorsports Park has also endured some tragic moments which have claimed the lives of the following competitors: David Peterson (1977), Tony Willman, Fred DeSarro, Harry Kourafus Jr., Dick Dixon, Corky Cookman, Tom Baldwin, Sr., John Blewett III, and most recently Shane Hammond (April 6, 2008).  DeSarro's death prompted a memorial fundraiser which drew the largest crowd to date and the Northeast's best drivers in an open competition Modified race with no purse.  Both Evans and Bodine mounted their cars with wings. Baldwin and Blewett died while competing in the same race on the tour, three years apart.

References

External links

Official site
Thompson Speedway Motorsports Park archive at Racing-Reference
The Golden Days: Thompson Speedway and Raceway by Terry O'Neil.  Published by Dalton Watson Fine Books.  2018.

Thompson
Thompson, Connecticut
Thompson
Thompson
Thompson
Thompson